Cellular and Molecular Life Sciences is a peer-reviewed scientific journal covering cellular and molecular life sciences. It was established in 1945 as Experientia, obtaining its current name in 1994. The Editors-in-chief are Roberto Bruzzone and Jean Leon Thomas. According to the Journal Citation Reports, the journal has a 2020 impact factor of 9.261.

References

External links 
 

Molecular and cellular biology journals
Publications established in 1945
Springer Science+Business Media academic journals
Monthly journals
English-language journals